Kenneth Goldstein may refer to:
 Ken Goldstein (born 1969), American film and television writer, producer and director
 Kenneth S. Goldstein (1927–1995), American folklorist, educator, record producer